Fernando Manzano Olguin (born September 14, 1961) is a United States district judge of the United States District Court for the Central District of California.

Early life and education 

Olguin was born on September 14, 1961 in Los Angeles, California. He earned a Bachelor of Arts degree in 1985 from Harvard University. In 1989, he earned a Master of Arts degree from the University of California, Berkeley and a Juris Doctor from UC Berkeley School of Law.  After law school, Olguin served as a law clerk to Judge Charles Andrew Muecke of the United States District Court for the District of Arizona.

Professional career 

From 1991 until 1994, Olguin was a trial attorney in the United States Department of Justice. He then worked as the education program director at the Mexican American Legal Defense and Educational Fund from 1994 until 1995.  From 1995 until 2001, Olguin worked as a partner at the law firm Traber, Voorhees & Olguin handling housing and employment matters. From 2001 through most of 2012, Olguin served as a United States magistrate judge for the Central District of California.

Federal judicial service 

On May 14, 2012, President Barack Obama nominated Olguin to serve as a United States District Judge for the Central District to fill the vacancy created by the elevation of Judge Jacqueline Nguyen to the United States Court of Appeals for the Ninth Circuit. Olguin's nomination was reported by the United States Senate Committee on the Judiciary to the full Senate on July 19, 2012. On December 17, 2012, the Senate confirmed Olguin in a voice vote. He received his commission on January 16, 2013.

Notable ruling 

In January 2022, Olguin granted a motion to dimiss a lawsuit filed by Spencer Elden against members of Nirvana when they used an image of him as a baby swimming naked underwater.

See also 
 List of Hispanic/Latino American jurists

References

External links 

1961 births
Living people
Harvard University alumni
Hispanic and Latino American judges
Judges of the United States District Court for the Central District of California
Lawyers from Los Angeles
United States magistrate judges
UC Berkeley School of Law alumni
United States district court judges appointed by Barack Obama
21st-century American judges
American people of Mexican descent